Vansbro AIK FK is a Swedish football club located in Vansbro.

Background
Vansbro AIK FK currently plays in Division 4 Dalarna which is the sixth tier of Swedish football. They play their home matches at the Vanåvallen in Vansbro. Vanåvallen was built in 1939 and its record attendance dates back to 1957 when 2 074 persons watched the derby game against Malungs IF.

The club is affiliated to Dalarnas Fotbollförbund. Vansbro AIK have competed in the Svenska Cupen on 18 occasions and have played 21 matches in the competition.

Season to season

In their most successful period Vansbro AIK FK competed in the following divisions:

In recent seasons Vansbro AIK FK have competed in the following divisions:

Footnotes

External links
 Vansbro AIK FK – Official website
 Vansbro AIK FK on Facebook

Football clubs in Dalarna County
Association football clubs established in 1920
1920 establishments in Sweden